Abaroa or Avaroa may refer to:

People:

 Eduardo Abaroa (1838–1879), also spelled Avaroa, a Bolivian hero of the War of the Pacific
 Gabriel Abaroa, the first president of the Latin Academy of Recording Arts & Sciences (LARAS)
 Ronald MacLean Abaroa, a Bolivian politician and leading international expert in anti-corruption programs

Places:

 Eduardo Avaroa province, Oruro department, Bolivia
 Eduardo Avaroa Andean Fauna National Reserve in Sur Lípez province, Potosí department, Bolivia